Zhao Xiaoli (born August 15, 1971) is a Chinese sprint canoer who competed in the early 1990s. At the 1992 Summer Olympics in Barcelona, she finished fifth in the K-4 500 m event and seventh in the K-2 500 m event.

References

Sports-Reference.com profile

1971 births
Canoeists at the 1992 Summer Olympics
Chinese female canoeists
Living people
Olympic canoeists of China
Asian Games medalists in canoeing
Canoeists at the 1994 Asian Games
Medalists at the 1994 Asian Games
Asian Games gold medalists for China